The 2014 Zimbabwe Tri-Series was a One Day International cricket tournament held in Zimbabwe. It was a tri-nation series between Zimbabwe, South Africa and Australia. South Africa won the series after defeating Australia in the final.

Squads

Group stage points table

Points System:

In the event of teams finishing on equal points, the right to play in the final match or series was determined as follows:
The team with the highest number of wins 
If still equal, the team with the highest number of wins over the other team(s) who are equal on points and have the same number of wins 
If still equal, the team with the highest number of bonus points 
If still equal, the team with the highest net run rate

In a match declared as no result, run rate is not applicable.

Won (W): 2
Lost (L): 0
No Result (NR): 1
Tie (T): 1

Net run rate (NRR): Runs per over scored less runs per over conceded, adjusting team batting first to overs of team batting second in rain rule matches, adjusting to team's full allocation if all out, and ignoring no result matches.

Group stage matches

1st match

2nd match

3rd match

4th match

5th match

6th match

Final

Statistics

Most Runs 
The top five run scorers (total runs) are included in this table.

Most Wickets

The top five wicket takers (total wickets) are listed in this table.

References

External links
 Series at CricInfo

2014 in Australian cricket
2014 in South African cricket
2014 in Zimbabwean cricket
Australian cricket tours of Zimbabwe
International cricket competitions in 2014
2014
One Day International cricket competitions